Alopecia mucinosa (also known as "Follicular mucinosis," "Mucinosis follicularis", "Pinkus' follicular mucinosis," and "Pinkus' follicular mucinosis–benign primary form") is a skin disorder that generally presents, but not exclusively, as erythematous plaques or flat patches without hair primarily on the scalp, neck and face.  This can also be present on the body as a follicular mucinosis and may represent a systemic disease.

Alopecia mucinosa occurs when mucinous material accumulates in the hair follicles and sebaceous glands. This triggers an inflammatory response, and affects the follicles ability to produce hair. This hair loss is reversible in the early stages, but once the disease advances, the hair follicles are destroyed, and Scarring alopecia occurs.

See also 
 List of cutaneous conditions

References

External links 

Conditions of the skin appendages
Mucinoses